†Leucocharis porphyrocheila is a species of air-breathing land snails, terrestrial pulmonate gastropod mollusks in the family Bothriembryontidae.

Description
The length of the shell attains 42.2 mm.

Distribution
This  marine species is endemic to New Caledonia.

References

External links
 Dautzenberg P. & Bernier J. (1901). Description d'un Bulimulidé nouveau provenant de la Nouvelle-Calédonie. Journal de Conchyliologie. 49(3): 215-216
 Dautzenberg P. (1902). Descriptions de coquilles nouvelles provenant de la Nouvelle-Calédonie. Journal de Conchyliologie. 49(4): 299-302, pl. 8
 Franc A. (1957). Mollusques terrestres et fluviatiles de l'archipel néo-calédonien. Mémoires du Muséum National d'Histoire Naturelle de Paris. ser. A (Zoologie), 13: 1-200, 24 pls
 Barker, G. M.; Brodie, G.; Bogitini, L.; Pippard, H. (2016). Diversity and current conservation status of Melanesian–New Zealand placostyline land snails (Gastropoda : Bothriembryontidae), with discussion of conservation imperatives, priorities and methodology issues. Pacific Conservation Biology. 22(3): 203
 Mollusc Specialist Group 1996.  Leucocharis porphyrocheila. 2006 IUCN Red List of Threatened Species.   Downloaded on 7 August 2007.

Leucocharis